Pope Pius XII created 56 cardinals in two consistories. On both occasions Pius tried to bring the membership of the College of Cardinals to 70, the maximum established by Pope Sixtus V in 1586. The death of one cardinal meant his first consistory brought the College to 69 members, but his second consistory, through the prompt addition of another name after a cardinal-designate died, brought the number of cardinals to 70.

Pius was elected in 1939 by a papal conclave in which 62 cardinals participated. The Second World War forced him to wait until 1946 to hold a consistory to create cardinals. He then waited seven years as the membership of the College fell to 46 before holding another consistory in 1953, and it had fallen to 53 when he died five and a half years later without holding another consistory.

Pius' cardinals included Angelo Roncalli, who succeeded him as Pope John XXIII. He created the first native-born Australian cardinal, and the first cardinals from Chile, China, Colombia, Cuba, Ecuador, and India; Teodósio de Gouveia was the first from Mozambique and the first cardinal to reside in Africa in the modern era. Those Pius named from Poland and Yugoslavia did not attend the consistory out of fear their governments would not allow them to return home.

By creating just four Italians out of 32 cardinals in 1946 and 10 of 24 in 1953, Pius transformed the geographic composition of the College of Cardinals. At the time of the conclave that elected him in 1939, 35 of the 62 cardinals were Italian. At his death in 1958, the Italians were 17 of 53. Over the same timespan, the number of non-Europeans grew from seven to 18.

18 February 1946

On 23 December 1945, Pope Pius XII announced he would create 32 cardinals at a consistory on 18 February 1946. The new cardinals came from 19 countries, with the number in the College of Cardinals from the Western Hemisphere growing from three to fourteen. Countries with their first cardinal included Chile, China, and Cuba; Mozambique got its first cardinal, though he was born in Portugal; Australia gained its first native-born cardinal. Only four were Italian. It was one of the largest groups of cardinals created at one time. Pius discussed the 70-member maximum, noting that it did not control his appointments, but said that he would adhere to it because he was already naming so many new cardinals. He said: "we have been anxious that the greatest number of races and peoples should be represented, so that this creation may portray in a living manner the universality of the church." The size of the College had not been as high as 70–the maximum established on 3 December 1586 by Pope Sixtus V–since the eighteenth century.

With this consistory, Italians became a minority in the College of Cardinals. When it was announced they were expected to hold 28 of the 70 places. The death of Cardinal Pietro Boetto on 31 January at the age of 74 changed the outcome of the consistory to 27 Italians out of 69. As a symbolic recognition of the end of World War II, two of the new cardinals, Bernard Griffin from Great Britain and Konrad von Preysing of Germany embraced when they met on 12 February in the Vatican. Agagianian, just 50, became the youngest member of the College, though his patriarch's title gave him precedence ahead of other cardinals created at this consistory. Of the 32, all were made cardinal priests but Bruno, a cardinal deacon.

The large number of new cardinals required moving the ceremony where the pope meets with the new cardinals from the papal apartments to the Hall of Benedictions, and for the public ceremony the papal throne was repositioned from the apse of St. Peter's Basilica to the steps of the Altar of Confession to allow for a larger crowd of spectators.  Three of the new cardinals were unable to attend the ceremonies on 18 February: Johannes de Jong and Jules-Géraud Saliège were unable to travel to Rome because of illness, and József Mindszenty was having problems obtaining a visa to travel from Hungary. Mindszenty arrived for the public ceremony on 21 February, but José María Caro and Manuel Arteaga y Betancourt were suffering from influenza. The next day, when the new cardinals received their rings, Juan Guevara was sick as well. Arteaga and Guevara received their insignia in a private ceremony with Pius on 28 February. Anticipating he would never be healthy enough to travel to Rome, de Jong received his biretta in Utrecht on 28 February as well. Finally, Caro and Saliège received their insignia from Pius on 17 May. By then the number of cardinals had fallen to 68 with the death of one of the new cardinals, John J. Glennon, on 9 March.

12 January 1953

On 29 November 1952 Pope Pius XII announced he would create 24 new cardinals in a consistory on 12 January 1953. Eleven of them were Italian and the membership of the college would reach the maximum of 70, with 27 Italians. Two were thought to be virtual prisoners in their countries, Aloysius Stepinac in Yugoslavia and Stefan Wyszyński in Poland. Those from Ecuador and Colombia were those countries' first cardinals. Stepinac and Wyszyński chose not to travel to Rome, fearing they would not be allowed to reenter their countries. Another new cardinal was Angelo Roncalli, who became Pope John XXIII in 1958.

One of those Pius named, Carlo Agostini, died on 28 December at the age of 64. The next day, the Vatican announced Valerian Gracias would be made a cardinal, the first from India, allowing the College to reach its maximum membership of 70, with 26 of them Italian.

Reviving a custom that had been interrupted, Pius announced that he was granting the request of Catholic heads of state in four countries to serve as his legate in delivering the cardinal's biretta to six of them, either residential bishops in or papal nuncios to their country: Generalissimo Francisco Franco of Spain for Gaetano Cicognani, Benjamín de Arriba y Castro, and Fernando Quiroga y Palacios; the socialist President of France Vincent Auriol for Angelo Roncalli; the President of Portugal for Pietro Ciriaci; and President Luigi Einaudi of Italy for Francesco Borgongini Duca. At the consistory Pius sharply criticized Yugoslavia and in milder language Poland and said the honor he was showing to two of their citizens was meant to honor their countries as well.

After creating 23 cardinals of the order of cardinal priests and one cardinal deacon (Ottaviani) on 12 January 1953, Pope Pius three days later gave seventeen of them their red galeros, sixteen their titular church assignments, and Ottaviani his deaconry.

When Pius died five years later, his failure to make Giovanni Battista Montini a cardinal at this conclave was much discussed. Though still in his fifties, Montini appeared to be groomed as Pius' successor and had long been his right hand at the Secretariat of State. Pius appointed him Archbishop of Milan in 1954, and Montini even received some votes at the 1958 conclave, where his prospects would have been very good had he been a cardinal. Instead he had to wait for the next conclave in 1963 to be elected Pope Paul VI.

Notes

References

Additional sources

External links

Pius XII
 
20th-century Catholicism
Pope Pius XII
College of Cardinals
1946 in Christianity
1953 in Christianity